Pasi Petriläinen (born 5 May 1978) is a Finnish ice hockey defenceman currently playing for France team Etoile Noire de Strasbourg who play in the Ligue Magnus.

Playing career
A New Jersey Devils draft pick (225th overall in 1996), Petriläinen spent six seasons with Tappara between 1994 and 2000 before moving to Sweden to play for Timrå IK in the Elitserien for one season.  He returned to SM-liiga in 2002 playing for TPS for two seasons.  He then returned to Tappara in 2003 for one season.  He went back to Sweden in 2004, joining second division side Skellefteå AIK before returning to Elitserien with Södertälje SK in an unsuccessful season which saw the team relegated to the second division.  He returned to Finland and joined Ilves.  In 2007, he signed with Olimpija Ljubljana. He signed with the Etoile Noire de Strasbourg (literally Black Star) for the 2010–2011 season.

Career statistics

External links

1978 births
People from Pirkkala
Étoile Noire de Strasbourg players
Finnish ice hockey defencemen
HDD Olimpija Ljubljana players
IF Björklöven players
Ilves players
Lempäälän Kisa players
Living people
New Jersey Devils draft picks
Skellefteå AIK players
Södertälje SK players
Tappara players
Timrå IK players
HC TPS players
Sportspeople from Pirkanmaa